The 2013–14 Romanian Hockey League season was the 84th season of the Romanian Hockey League, the top level of ice hockey in Romania. Six teams participated in the league, and ASC Corona 2010 Braşov won the championship.

Regular season

5th place game 

 CSM Dunărea Galați - Sportul Studențesc 3:0 (10:5, 15:1, 9:5)

Playoffs

Semifinals 

 Steaua Rangers - HSC Csíkszereda 0:3 (2:4, 1:9, 2:9)
 CS Progym Gheorgheni - ASC Corona Brașov 0:3 (3:4, 2:3, 2:5)

3rd place game 

 Steaua Rangers - CS Progym Gheorgheni 1:3 (6:3, 2:4, 4:5, 0:4)

Final 

 ASC Corona Brașov - HSC Csíkszereda 4:3 (3:1, 1:2, 2:5, 3:2 OT, 4:3 OT, 1:3, 4:3)

External links 
 Romanian Ice Hockey Federation

Rom
2013–14 in Romanian ice hockey
Romanian Hockey League seasons